The Long, Hot Summer is a 1958 American drama film directed by Martin Ritt. The screenplay was written by Irving Ravetch and Harriet Frank Jr., based in part on three works by William Faulkner: the 1931 novella "Spotted Horses", the 1939 short story "Barn Burning" and the 1940 novel The Hamlet. The title is taken from The Hamlet, as Book Three is called "The Long Summer". Some characters, as well as tone, were inspired by Tennessee Williams' 1955 play, Cat on a Hot Tin Roof, a film adaptation of which – also starring Paul Newman – was released five months later.

The plot follows the conflicts of the Varner family after ambitious drifter Ben Quick (Newman) arrives in their small Mississippi town. Will Varner (Orson Welles), the patriarch, has doubts about his son, Jody (Anthony Franciosa) and sees Ben as a better choice to inherit his position. Will tries to push Ben and his daughter Clara (Joanne Woodward) into marriage.

Filmed in Clinton, Louisiana, the cast was composed mostly of former Actors Studio students, whom Ritt met while he was an assistant teacher to Elia Kazan. For the leading role, Warner Bros. loaned Newman to 20th Century Fox. The production was marked by conflicts between Welles and Ritt, which drew media attention. The music score was composed by Alex North and the title song, "The Long Hot Summer", written by North and Sammy Cahn, was performed by Jimmie Rodgers.

The film was well received by critics but did not score significant results at the box office. Its critical success revitalized Ritt's career, after his having been blacklisted during most of the 1950s. Newman won the Best Actor Award at the Cannes Film Festival.

Plot

Ben Quick is on trial for barn-burning, but when no solid evidence is found, the judge expels him from town. Ben hitches a ride to Frenchman's Bend, Mississippi, with two young women in a convertible, Clara Varner and her sister-in-law Eula (Lee Remick). Clara's father, Will Varner, is the domineering owner of most of the town.

Ben goes to the Varner plantation. Will is away, but his only son, Jody, agrees to let Ben become a sharecropper on a vacant farm. When Will returns from a stay in the hospital, he is furious at Jody for hiring a notorious "barn burner", but soon begins to see in Ben a younger version of himself and comes to admire his ruthlessness and ambition, qualities that Jody lacks. Will is also disappointed with the man that his 23-year-old daughter, Clara, has been seeing for five or six years: Alan Stewart (Richard Anderson), a genteel Southern "blue blood" and a mama's boy.

Will therefore schemes to push his daughter and Ben together, to try to bring fresh, virile blood into the family. However, she is openly hostile to the crude, if magnetic, upstart. Will is determined to have his bloodline go on, so he offers to make Ben wealthy if he marries Clara. Meanwhile, Minnie Littlejohn (Angela Lansbury), Will's long-time mistress, is dissatisfied with their arrangement and wants to get married.

Jody becomes increasingly frustrated, seeing his position in the family being undermined. After Ben sells some wild horses for Will, he is rewarded with the position of clerk in the general store, alongside Jody. Will even invites him to live in the family mansion.

This is the final straw for Jody. He pulls a gun on Ben and threatens to kill him.  Ben talks his way out by telling Jody about buried Civil War-era treasure he has supposedly found on a property that Will gave him, a down payment to seal their bargain over Clara. Jody starts digging and finds a bag of coins. He is elated, thinking he might finally free himself of his father's domination; he buys the land from Ben. Late that night, Will finds his son, still digging. After examining one of the coins, Will notices that it was minted in 1910. Jody is shattered.

Ben aggressively pursues Clara. She finally asks Alan what his intentions are, and does not like what she hears. A defeated Jody finds his father alone in their barn. Jody bolts the entrance and sets the barn on fire, but he cannot go through with it and releases Will. The incident leads to a reconciliation between father and son. Men from town assume Ben is the culprit and start toward him, but Clara persuades him to get into her car and they drive away. Then Will defuses the situation by saying he accidentally started the fire by dropping his cigar.

The smell of fire brings back bad memories for Ben, who confesses to Clara that his father was a real barn-burner. He tells her how, at age ten, he warned a farmer that his father was about to set another fire. Ben's father got away, never to be seen again. Ben tells her he is leaving town, but Clara makes it clear she has fallen in love with him. An elated Will confides to Minnie that life is so good, he may have to live forever.

Cast
 Paul Newman as Ben Quick. Newman met director Martin Ritt as a student at the Actors Studio, where Ritt was a teacher-assistant for Elia Kazan. Newman, who was under a contract with Warner Brothers, was loaned to 20th Century Fox for a fee of US$75,000. Meanwhile, his contract earned him US$17,500 for each ten-week shot. He traveled to Clinton, Louisiana, before the start of filming to study the mannerisms, accent and speech of the Southern men in order to create a proper characterization.
 Orson Welles as Will Varner. The character was inspired by Big Daddy Pollitt from Tennessee Williams' play Cat on a Hot Tin Roof. Welles' presence on the film was marked by multiple conflicts with director Martin Ritt. He agreed to take the role due to a tax debt of US$150,000; he stated years later, "I hated making Long Hot Summer. I've seldom been as unhappy in a picture".

Director Martin Ritt met the three cast members listed below while they were students at the Actors Studio.
 Joanne Woodward as Clara Varner. Woodward ended up marrying co-star Newman in 1958.
 Anthony Franciosa as Jody Varner
 Lee Remick as Eula Varner. Remick later admitted that during the shooting she was intimidated by Orson Welles on the set because of his "icon" status.

The supporting roles were played by:
 Angela Lansbury as Minnie Littlejohn
 Richard Anderson as Alan Stewart
 Sarah Marshall as Agnes Stewart
 Mabel Albertson as Elizabeth Stewart
 J. Pat O'Malley as Ratliff
 William "Bill" Walker as Lucius
 Francis Sibley as the bass player in the band.

Production

Development
Producer Jerry Wald hired former co-worker and Warner Brothers director Martin Ritt to shoot the adaptation of two William Faulkner novels based on a recommendation by script writer Irving Ravetch. Wald convinced the studio executives to pay US$50,000 for the rights for the novels The Sound and the Fury and The Hamlet. The first to be produced, The Hamlet, was renamed The Long Hot Summer to avoid confusion with William Shakespeare's play Hamlet. Ravetch and Harriet Frank, Jr. wrote the script, also adding fragments from Faulkner's short stories "Barn Burning" and "Spotted Horses". In the new script, the book's main character, Flem Snopes, and the rest of the Snopes family were removed. The plot was recentered on a minor character, Ben Quick, and the reconciliation of the Varner family. On their first important screenplay, Ravetch and Frank implemented their signature style, using the names of characters and a few details of the plot but significantly modifying the details of the story. The final product was heavily influenced by Tennessee Williams' play Cat on a Hot Tin Roof, resulting in an "erotically charged" story.

Locations
The film was shot in Clinton and Baton Rouge, Louisiana, in CinemaScope color, with a budget of US$1,645,000. A Southern Gothic story, Ritt decided to shoot it on location to capture the characteristics of the area, emphasizing the regional details. Ritt met leading actor Paul Newman while teaching at the Actors Studio. The rest of the main cast also consisted of former Actors Studio alumni, including Joanne Woodward, Anthony Franciosa and Lee Remick.

Casting
The film attracted attention for the appearance of Orson Welles as Will Varner, the patriarch of the family. 20th Century Fox wanted to avoid casting Welles because of his temperament, but the studio was persuaded by Ritt, who considered him the right actor for the role. The director and the actor had several marked differences during the shooting of the movie, which included problems with the interpretation of the lines, costume design and the position of Welles while shooting the scenes. At one point during the production, Welles informed Ritt that he did not want to memorize his lines, requesting instead that they be dubbed afterwards. Part of the cast was intimidated by Welles' temperamental attitude.

The conflicts between Welles and Ritt attracted media attention. Immediately after filming was completed, during an interview with Life, Welles explained that the cause of his behavior was that he did not know what kind of "monkeyshines" his co-stars would be or the "caprices" they would receive from him. He also stated that they overcame the differences and completed the film.  Welles later wrote a letter to Ritt praising his work and apologizing for his interference during the making of the movie. Ritt replied, expounding his admiration for Welles. Despite the mutual apologies, during an interview in 1965, Ritt recalled an incident on the set. While the film was being shot, it was often stopped by bad weather. During a day suitable for shooting, he found Welles not ready for the scene, instead reading a newspaper in Spanish. Ritt decided to skip Welles's scene and shoot the next one. He attributed Welles' later cooperation to the incident, which Welles had found humiliating.  Ritt thus earned the nickname "the Orson Tamer" throughout the Hollywood community.

Soundtrack

Alex North composed the film's score, which leaned toward a jazz style. "The Long Hot Summer" was the only song written by North to be used as the title track of a film. Composed in an AABA form, it was characterized by its lyricisms and its "tense dissonant" jazz-figures. The lyrics of the song were written by Sammy Cahn, while instrumental variations of the melody were used throughout the film, underlining the progression of the relationship between Ben and Clara. Recorded by Jimmie Rodgers,  it was released by Roulette Records, reaching number 77 on Billboard'''s Top 100 Sides in June 1958. The orchestra was conducted by Lionel Newman.Billboard described the soundtrack as "a model of music use in a dramatic  film". On another review, Billboard favored the album, stating that it "makes for good listening out of the cinematic context" and that the financial success of the soundtrack may have been propelled by Jimmie Rodgers' "smooth vocal treatment".  The publication praised North's musical understanding of the deep South, and particularly praised the song "Eula", describing it as a "pure gem of sex-on-wax".

Release and reception
The movie opened on March 13, 1958, in several cities around the United States, including Los Angeles and San Francisco. It grossed $48,000 from four theaters in Los Angeles and $15,000 in San Francisco in its first week. It opened to good reviews but did not score a significant profit at the box office, grossing US$3,500,000.Billboard commended the acting as "first-rate" and "robust", with particular praise for Woodward, and also praised Ritt's direction. Meanwhile, The Reporter highlighted the film's similarities to the play Cat on a Hot Tin Roof and described the cast as "an impressive one", but remarked that the actors and characters "never seem to get together". The review called Welles "great" and "gusty", but described Woodward's participation as a "poker bluff".Time described Newman's performance as "mean and keen as a cackle-edge scythe". The publication also praised Woodward, stating her acting was delivered with "fire and grace not often seen in a movie queen", but decried Welles's acting as "scarcely an improvement" on his performance in his previous role, in Moby Dick. Variety praised the scriptwriters for the successful merging of the three Faulkner stories that inspired the film. The review also praised Martin Ritt, the camerawork by Joseph LaShelle, and the film's musical score. Cosmopolitan called the movie a "gutsy melodrama".

For The New York Times, critic Bosley Crowther noted Ravetch and Frank's "tight, word-cracking" script that featured fast paced scenes with "slashing dialogue". The reviewer felt that the cast was "clicking nicely" until the story of the writers "plunged" from the dramatic scenes to "sheer story-telling make-believe", while Crowther concluded that it went from "superb" to a "senseless, flabby heap". The Los Angeles Times opened its review qualifying the movie as "provocative, evocative". While critic Phillip K. Scheuer  failed to see the plot's relation to The Hamlet, he praised the work of writers Ravetch and Frank, as well as the "exacting direction" of Ritt. Scheuer perceived the southern accents of the cast and the use of redness on their make-up to be unauthentic, but he felt that the use of the Louisiana landscapes and the development of the characters gave the film a "comulative bite" and a "powerful persuader" that "you are there". The review described Welles' acting as "terrific" and as dominating of the plot, while it favored Newman, Woodward and the supporting cast. Closing the piece, Scheuer wrote that he could not "get the sense" of the ending, while it mentioned as "top credits" the contributions of North on the soundtrack and Lashelle's camerawork.The Miami Herald pointed that the story did not resemble Faulkner's work excepting his use of "lusty accessories". The reviewer implied that most moviegoers would be not familiar with the work of Faulkner, while he remarked that the film would be "perfectly satisfactory". The piece closed by again criticizing the producers that felt that "Louisiana looked more than Mississippi than Mississippi does", and the newspaper took it as an example of the "liberties" taken with Faulkner's work.The Memphis Press-Scimitar welcomed Welles' performance as "superb", while it also remarked the large difference between the original stories and the movie. Also in Memphis, The Commercial Appeal defined The Long, Hot Summer as a "sizzler", that showed a "superior" performance by Woodward, as well as a "stellar" cast. The piece determined that the "tempestuous, earthy" plotline would not be suitable for the "immature", rather for the "adult" that would find it to be a "dynamic drama" for the "swirling turbulence" of the Varner family and the "frank omnipresence  of sex". The Austin American-Statesman considered that Welles represented "one of the picture's more entertaining features" that made the film "gripping", along with the "able performances" and "crisp dialogue".

For the New York Daily News, Kate Cameron gave The Long, Hot Summer four stars. She described the work of the writers in integrating Faulkner's three works as a "fascinating saga". Cameron called the cast "first rate", with a "smoothly and convincingly" direction by Ritt. The Chicago Tribune wrote that the movie had a "first rate" cast, praised the photography and defined the end result as "engrossing entertainment". The Boston Globe defined the location as "authentic", while the reviewer felt that the plot "has bite" and its pace advanced as "a race horse". The newspaper hailed Woodward's interpretation of the character as "a polished perfection of understanding". The Cincinnati Enquirer'' opened stating that doubts regarding Woodward's acting "are put at rest" with the release that it called "adult theater".

Legacy
The film revived the career of Martin Ritt, who had been on the blacklist for most of the decade for alleged associations with communists.

Paul Newman's performance as Ben Quick brought him national fame, as well as the Best Actor Award at the Cannes Film Festival. During the production, Newman married co-star Woodward.

In 2002, the film was nominated for the American Film Institute's AFI's 100 Years...100 Passions list.

A television series of the same name aired between 1965 and 1966, featuring Dan O'Herlihy, Roy Thinnes, Nancy Malone, Lana Wood, Ruth Roman, and Edmond O'Brien. It was remade for television in 1985, featuring Jason Robards, Don Johnson, and Cybill Shepherd. This rendition received two Emmy nominations, for Outstanding Miniseries and Outstanding Art Direction for a Miniseries or a Special.

See also
 List of American films of 1958

References

Bibliography

External links

 
 
 
 

1958 films
1958 drama films
1950s English-language films
20th Century Fox films
American drama films
CinemaScope films
Films adapted into television shows
Films based on American novels
Films based on multiple works
Films based on short fiction
Films based on works by William Faulkner
Films directed by Martin Ritt
Films produced by Jerry Wald
Films scored by Alex North
Films set in Mississippi
Films shot in Louisiana
Southern Gothic films
1950s American films